Faqeer Sher Muhammad Bilaiani (born 2 January 1958) is a Pakistani politician who had been a member of the National Assembly of Pakistan, from June 2013 to May 2018 representing Tharparkar.

Early life
He was born on 2 January 1958.

Political career
He ran for the seat of the National Assembly of Pakistan as an independent candidate from Constituency NA-229 (Tharparkar-I) in 2008 Pakistani general election but was unsuccessful. He received 9 votes and lost the seat to Arbab Zakaullah. In the same election, he ran for the seat of the Provincial Assembly of Sindh as an independent candidate from Constituency PS-61 (Tharparkar-II) and from Constituency PS-62 (Tharparkar-III) but was unsuccessful. He received 7 votes from Constituency PS-61 (Tharparkar-II) and lost the seat to Arbab Zulfiqar Ali, a candidate of Pakistan Muslim League (Q) (PML-Q) and received 6 votes from Constituency PS-62 (Tharparkar-III) and lost the seat to Arbab Haji Abdullah, a candidate of PML-Q.

He was elected to the National Assembly as a candidate of Pakistan Peoples Party (PPP) from Constituency NA-229 (Tharparkar-I) in 2013 Pakistani general election. He received 88,218 votes and defeated an independent candidate, Arbab Togachi Fawad Razzak.

He was elected to Provincial Assembly of Sindh as a candidate of PPP from Constituency PS-56 (Tharparkar-III) in 2018 Pakistani general election.

References

Living people
Pakistan People's Party MPAs (Sindh)
Sindhi people
Pakistani MNAs 2013–2018
People from Sindh
1958 births
Sindh MPAs 2018–2023